Holzrichter Glacier is a broad tributary glacier which drains the northeastern slopes of the Prince Olav Mountains of Antarctica between Mount Wade and Mount Oliver and enters Gough Glacier just north of Mount Dodge. It was named by the Advisory Committee on Antarctic Names for Captain Max A. Holzrichter, U.S. Navy, Deputy Commander and Chief of Staff of the U.S. Naval Support Force, Antarctica in 1964 and 1965.

References

Glaciers of Dufek Coast